Bromley Cricket Club was one of the strongest English cricket clubs in the mid-18th century when its team was led by Robert Colchin a.k.a. "Long Robin".

Earliest mentions
Cricket almost certainly originated in Kent and Sussex so it must have been played in and around Bromley since time immemorial. The first definite mention of the area in a cricket connection is a 1735 match on Bromley Common between a Kent side and London Cricket Club. The report of this match states that "a large crowd attended and a great deal of mischief was done. It seems that horses panicked and riders were thrown while some members of the crowd were ridden over. One man was carried off for dead as HRH passed by at the entrance to the Common". "HRH" was Frederick, Prince of Wales.

1740s
Apart from Colchin, Bromley also produced noted players like John Bowra, his son William Bowra and the brothers James and John Bryant.

A match took place in June 1742 between London and Bromley at the Artillery Ground which is the second known instance of a match finishing as a tie.

The club probably reached its peak in September 1744, a time when Colchin was also at the pinnacle of his career.  Following the victory over London by Richard Newland's Slindon at the Artillery Ground, the "Slindon Challenge" was issued to "play any parish in England".  They received immediate acceptances from Addington Cricket Club and from Bromley who were due to play Slindon in the same month.

Bromley was a top-class team through the 1740s until its final important match in 1752, two years after Colchin's death.

References

Former senior cricket clubs
English cricket teams in the 18th century
Sports clubs established in the 18th century
Cricket in Kent
English club cricket teams
Sport in the London Borough of Bromley